In mathematics, an invariant polynomial is a polynomial  that is invariant under a group  acting on a vector space . Therefore,  is a -invariant polynomial if

Cases of particular importance are for Γ a finite group (in the theory of Molien series, in particular), a compact group, a Lie group or algebraic group. For a basis-independent definition of 'polynomial' nothing is lost by referring to the symmetric powers of the given linear representation of Γ.

References

Commutative algebra
Invariant theory
Polynomials